Norman Tregenza from Conway, New Hampshire is a Republican former member of the New Hampshire House of Representatives. He represented the Carroll 2nd district from 2010 to 2012. He is also an occasional substitute teacher for Kennett High School in Conway.

Committee assignments

2011-2012
In the 2011-2012 legislative session, Tregenza was appointed to the Judiciary Committee, New Hampshire House.
Norman Tregenza resigned in May 2012.

Elections

2010
On November 2, 2010, Tregenza won the election to the New Hampshire House of Representatives.

Campaign donors

2010
In 2010, a year in which Tregenza was up for re-election, he did not collect any money in donations.

External links
Norman Tregenza at New Hampshire House of Representatives website
Biography from Project Vote Smart
Legislative profile from Project Vote Smart
 Campaign contributions: 2010

References

Republican Party members of the New Hampshire House of Representatives
21st-century American politicians
People from Conway, New Hampshire